Plusia festucae (gold spot) is a species of moth of the family Noctuidae. It is found throughout the Palearctic realm from Ireland to Japan.

Technical description and variation

The wingspan is 34–46 mm. Forewing deep golden brown, with a golden metallic sheen at base of costa, on inner margin of median area, and on an oblique patch before apex; lines all oblique, dark brown; veins dark brown; at base of vein 2 a large silvery rounded blotch, with a smaller, more elongate, one beyond it; the lowest streak of the apical blotch, below vein 6, and a spot at base of costa are also silvery; hindwing bronzy fuscous, with pinkish fringe.

Biology
The moth flies from June to September depending on the location.

Larva green; dorsal line dark green, edged with white; subdorsal and lateral lines white; spiracular yellowish; head green. The larvae feed on Carex, Sparganium erectum, Iris pseudacorus and Alisma. Pupates in a whitish cocoon on the underside of a blade of grass, doubled over for the purpose.

References

External links

Gold spot at UKmoths
Funet Taxonomy
Lepiforum.de
Vlindernet.nl 

Plusiinae
Moths described in 1758
Moths of Asia
Moths of Europe
Moths of Japan
Taxa named by Carl Linnaeus